West Virginia Route 8 is a north–south state highway in Hancock County in West Virginia's Northern Panhandle. The southern terminus of the route is at West Virginia Route 2 on the northern outskirts of New Cumberland. The northern terminus is at U.S. Route 30 southeast of Chester.

WV 8 was formerly part of WV 2, with WV 66 following present WV 2 north of New Cumberland.

Major intersections

References

008
West Virginia Route 008